Juan Paletta is a retired Argentinian football (soccer) forward who played in the North American Soccer League and American Soccer League who shared the ASL scoring title in 1970.

In 1967, Paletta signed with the Ukrainian Nationals of the American Soccer League.  In 1968, he moved to the Washington Whips of the North American Soccer League.  He was back in the American Soccer League with the Philadelphia Spartans.  In 1970, he tied Willie Mfum for the league scoring title.  In 1974, Paletta signed with the Philadelphia Atoms of the NASL.  He did not play during the 1975 season.  On March 23, 1976, Paletta rejoined the Atoms but saw no playing time that season.

References

External links
 Philadelphia Atoms roster
 NASL stats

Living people
Argentine footballers
Argentine expatriate footballers
Argentine expatriate sportspeople in the United States
American Soccer League (1933–1983) players
North American Soccer League (1968–1984) players
Philadelphia Atoms players
Philadelphia Spartans players
Philadelphia Ukrainian Nationals players
Washington Whips players
Association football defenders
Year of birth missing (living people)
Footballers from Rosario, Santa Fe